Scrobipalpa punctata is a moth of the family Gelechiidae. It is found in Russia (the southern Ural) and Kyrgyzstan.

References

Moths described in 1996
Scrobipalpa